Daniel "Dan" Stewart (born James "Jimmy" Lowell) is a fictional character from the daytime soap opera As the World Turns.

Storylines
Viewers saw Dan's beginnings as Jimmy Lowell, and watched as Ellen, a young single mother, gave up Jimmy for adoption. After Dan's adoptive mother died, his birth mother married his adoptive father, David Stewart, and mother and son were reunited.

Dan was married to heroines Liz Talbot and Kim Reynolds, as well as the more villainous Susan Burke. A love quadrangle with Dan, Susan, Liz and Dan's brother Paul was a cornerstone of the show's storylines for many years.

The character of Dan died of a brain tumor. Dan's daughters, Emily Stewart and Betsy Stewart, figured prominently into subsequent stories on As the World Turns.

References

External links

As the World Turns characters
Television characters introduced in 1958